Timecop may refer to:

 Timecop (franchise), a series of works relating to a police officer working with time travel, including:
 Timecop, a 1994 film starring Jean-Claude Van Damme
 Timecop (comics), a comic published in 1992 and 1994
 Timecop (TV series), an ABC TV series which first aired in 1997
 Timecop (video game), a 1995 SNES video game